Romankenkius is a genus of freshwater planarian in the family Dugesiidae.

Species
The following species are recognised in the genus Romankenkius:<ref>*Tyler S, Schilling S, Hooge M, and Bush LF (comp.) (2006-2012) Turbellarian taxonomic database. Version 1.7  Database </ref>Romankenkius bilineatus Ball & Tran, 1979Romankenkius conspectus Sluys & Grant, 2006Romankenkius flaccidus Sluys, 2018Romankenkius glandulosus Kenk, 1930Romankenkius hoernesi Weiss, 1909Romankenkius impudicus Sluys & Grant, 2006Romankenkius kenki Ball, 1974Romankenkius libidinosus Sluys & Rohdes, 1991Romankenkius patagonicus (Borelli, 1901)Romankenkius pedderensis Ball, 1974 (Lake Pedder planarian)Romankenkius retrobursalis Sluys & Grant, 2006Romankenkius sinuosus'' Sluys & Kawakatsu, 2001

References

Dugesiidae
Rhabditophora genera
Taxonomy articles created by Polbot